Chainsaw is a single by the band Skinny Puppy. It contains new material, as well as additional material taken from their albums Bites and Mind: The Perpetual Intercourse.

Track listing

Personnel
Nivek Ogre
cEvin Key

Guests
D. Rudolph Goettel (keyboards, gadgetry - 1, 4, 5)
David Jackson (chainsaw - 1)
Tom Ellard (drums, CDs, effects - 1; tapes, EQ knobs, sampling - 2)
Wilhelm Schroeder (bass synth - 3; backing voice - 4, 5)
Mr. D. Plevin (bass guitar - 3)

Notes
Engineered by cEvin Key and Dave Ogilvie.
Tracks 1-3 mixed by Key, Ogilvie, and Ogre, assisted by Ric Arboit.
Additional production, instrumentation and engineering on tracks 4-5 by Justin Strauss and Murry Elias, with edits by Chep Nunez. Remixed by Justin Strauss and Murry Elias.
Sleeve photography, typography and design by Steven R. Gilmore.
The front cover art features The Vision of Death and the back cover features Babylon Fallen, both by Gustave Doré.
Two different versions were released on vinyl;  one featuring the original labels (light orange) and one with new labels (pink and green).

References

External links

Single
Chainsaw at Discogs (CD, Maxi-Single, Nettwerk, Canada)
Chainsaw at Discogs (Cassette, Maxi-Single, Nettwerk, Canada)
Chainsaw at Discogs (Vinyl, 12", 33⅓ rpm, Nettwerk, Canada)

1987 singles
Skinny Puppy songs
Capitol Records singles
Nettwerk Records singles
1987 songs
Songs written by cEvin Key
Songs written by Dave Ogilvie
Songs written by Dwayne Goettel
Songs written by Tom Ellard